Ram Narayan Mishra was the Minister for Industry and Commerce in the BP Koirala cabinet of 1959. He took his office of the Ministry on 27 May 1959. He was also a democratic fighter of Nepal and a founder member of Nepali Congress. He was the founder of the famous public company Janakpur Cigarette Factory Limited. This factory was established with Russian assistance. He was a Maithil Brahmin from Pipara village of Mahottari district of Nepal. He also established Ram Narayan Ayodhya Higher Secondary School at Pipara village. He was selected as the plenipotentiary from His Majesty's government of Nepal for Treaty of trade and transit between the Government of India and His Majesty's Government of Nepal [1960].

References 

Nepali Congress politicians from Madhesh Province
Year of birth missing
Year of death missing
Maithil Brahmin
Nepal MPs 1959–1960